Mantarraya Productions, is an independent cinema production company funded in 1998.  On their web page they define Mantarraya as; "... works as a platform for a new generation of filmmakers and has earned a reputation for promoting new talent".

NDMantarraya is the label they use for distribution (in association with Nodream Cinema company of film director Carlos Reygadas), and NDM is the international sales company label.

Mantarraya Productions is known for their risky content on their films. They are the Mexican production company with the most international film awards in the last 50 years. Since 2002 they participated eight times in different sections of the Cannes Film Festival and their parallel sections; six times in the "Official Selection", four of them in the Competition and two more in "Un Certain Regard", also they have been invited 2 times to the Directors' Fortnight a parallel section of Cannes Film Festival.

The Mexican Academy choose Heli to represent Mexico for the 2014 Oscars Award.

Spontaneous generation

In 2005 Mantarraya participated with two of their productions in the "Official Selection" at the Cannes Film Festival, unusual for an independent production.  That year they participated with Battle in Heaven by Carlos Reygadas invited to the Competition and Sangre by Amat Escalante who was invited to Un Certain Regard where the film was honored by the FIPRESCI Award.

In 2005 the French newspaper Le Monde referred to them as: "Mexique, la génération spontanée".

In 2007 they repeated this achievement as they were invited with two other of their productions, Silent Light by Carlos Reygadas who received the Jury Prize in the Competition of the "Official Selection" and La Influencia by Pedro Aguilera that premiered at the Fortnight sidebar of the Cannes Film Festival.

Cannes awards 

2002 Japón by Carlos Reygadas receives a "Special Mention" for the Caméra d'Or
2005 Sangre by Amat Escalante is awarded the Fipresci Award. The last time a Mexican production had been honored with this award at the Cannes Film Festival was given to the film "Cada vez mas Lejos" by Luis Alcoriza back in 1965.
2007 Silent Light by Carlos Reygadas receives the Jury Prize. It is the first time in history that a Mexican director (Carlos Reygadas) receives the Jury Prize at Cannes. This recognition has been received by directors like; Ingmar Bergman, Michelangelo Antonioni, Robert Bresson, Costa-Gavras, Krzysztof Kieślowski, Ken Loach, Lars von Trier, Manoel de Oliveira and David Cronenberg among others.
2012 Post Tenebras Lux by Carlos Reygadas receives the Award for "Best Director".
2013 Heli by Amat Escalante receives the Award for "Best Director". For the second time in a row and third time in history a Mexican director receives this award. In 2012 Carlos Reygadas and in 2006 was received by Alejandro González Iñárritu with his film Babel. This recognition has been also received by directors like; Luis Buñuel, Robert Bresson, Ingmar Bergman, François Truffaut, Costa-Gavras, Terrence Malick, Werner Herzog, Andrei Tarkovsky, Martin Scorsese, Wim Wenders, David Lynch, Pedro Almodóvar, Wong Kar-wai and Michael Haneke among others.

Venice awards 
2016 The Untamed by Amat Escalante receives the Award for "Best Director".

Filmography 

{| class="wikitable sortable"
!width="1%"|Year
!width="13%"|Original title
!width="13%"|English title
!width="12%"|Director
!width="1%"|Duration
!width="31%"|World premiere
!width="29%"|Notable awards or nominations
|-
|-style=background:#efefef;
| 2016
| La Region Salvaje
| The Untamed
| Amat Escalante
| 90 min
| Venice Film Festival "Competition" "Official Selection"
| Best Director (Venice Film Festival) 
|-
|-style=background:#efefef;
| 2013
| Heli
| Heli
| Amat Escalante
| 105 min
| Cannes Film Festival "Competition" "Official Selection"
| Best Director (Cannes Film Festival) Representing México for the Oscar Awards
| 
|-
|-style=background:#efefef;
| 2013
| Halley
| Halley
| Sebastian Hofmann
| 80 min
| Rotterdam Film Festival – Competition Sundance Film Festival
| 
|
|-
|-style=background:#efefef;
| 2012
| Post Tenebras Lux
| Post Tenebras Lux
| Carlos Reygadas
| 110 min
| Cannes Film Festival "Competition" "Official Selection"
| Best Director (Cannes Film Festival)
|
|-
|-style=background:#efefef;
| 2010
| Alamar
| To the Sea
| Pedro Gonzalez-Rubio
| 73 min
| Toronto International Film Festival
| Tiger Award (Rotterdam Film Festival)
|
|-
|-style=background:#efefef;
| 2010
| Río de Oro
| River of Gold
| Pablo Aldrete
| 100 min
| Toulouse Film Festival "Competition"
| Nominated to the Golden Star / Grand Prix Award
|
|-
|-style=background:#efefef;
| 2010
| Flores en el Desierto
| Flowers in the Desert
| Jose Alvarez
| 71 min
| Morelia Int. Film Festival
| Best Documentary Morelia Int. Film Festival
|
|-
|-style=background:#efefef;
| 2009
| El Arbol
| The Tree
| Carlos Serrano
| 71 min
| San Sebastián Film Festival
| Nominated to the Mayahuel de Oro (Guadalajara Film Festival)
|
|-
|-style=background:#efefef;
| 2008
| Los Bastardos
| Los Bastardos
| Amat Escalante
| 90 min
| Cannes Film Festival "Un Certain Regard" "Official Selection"
| Best Film "(Morelia Film Festival)"
|
|-
|-style=background:#efefef;
| 2007
| La Influencia
| La Influencia
| Pedro Aguilera
| 110 min
| Directors' Fortnight "Parallel Section" Cannes Film Festival
| Premio Edad de Oro (Cinedecuverts Bruselas)
|
|-
|-style=background:#efefef;
| 2007
| Luz Silenciosa (aka Stellet Litch)
| Silent Light
| Carlos Reygadas
| 145 min
| Cannes Film Festival "Competition" "Official Selection"
| Best Director (Cannes Film Festival)5 Ariel Awards (Mexican Academy), including "Best Film" Representing México for the Oscar AwardsSpirit Award Nominations (Best Foreign Film)
|
|-
|-style=background:#efefef;
| 2005
| Sangre
| Sangre
| Amat Escalante
| 90 min
| Cannes Film Festival "Un Certain Regard" "Official Selection"
| FIPRESCI Award (Festival de Cannes)
|
|-
|-style=background:#efefef;
| 2005
| Batalla en el Cielo
| Battle in Heaven
| Carlos Reygadas
| 97 min
| Cannes Film Festival "Competition" "Official Selection"
| FIPRESCI Award (Rio Film Festival)
|
|-
|-style=background:#efefef;
| 2005
| Nippon e Yokoso
| Nippon e Yokoso
| Pablo Aldrete
| 75 min
|
|
|
|-
|-style=background:#efefef;
| 2002
| Japón
| Japón
| Carlos Reygadas
| 130 min
| Directors' Fortnight "Parallel Section" Cannes Film Festival
| Special Mention"  Caméra d'Or' Cannes Film Festival
|
|}

 References 

Pablo Siedlecki - http://www.lemonde.fr/culture/article/2005/05/11/mexique-la-generation-spontanee_647721_3246.html - Le Monde. Retrieved 11 May 2005.
John Hopewell - https://variety.com/2013/biz/news/ndm-takes-viggo-mortensen-starrer-untitled-exclusive-1200482444/ - Variety. Retrieved 16 May 2013.
Maane Khatchatourian - https://variety.com/2013/film/news/mexico-picks-heli-for-oscars-foreign-language-film-race-1200616491/ - Variety. Retrieved 18 September 2013.
Michael O'Boyle - https://variety.com/2006/film/news/romandia-crosses-border-1200335902/ - Variety''. Retrieved 21 May 2006.

External links
 

Mass media companies established in 1998
Film production companies of Mexico
Mass media in Mexico City